Ever After is a live album by The Mission. It is compiled from various shows and Wayne Hussey's own archives on the band's 1999 'Resurrection' tour. It was released on CD in 2000 and includes a studio recording of The Osmonds song Crazy Horses previously released as a fan club flexidisc.

Track listing
 "Intro" - 1:51
 "Beyond the Pale" - 4:50
 "Hands Across the Ocean" - 3:28
 "Into the Blue" - 4:03
 "Butterfly on a Wheel" - 5:55
 "Raising Cain" - 5:15
 "Heaven Knows" - 5:56
 "Sway" - 4:30
 "Sacrilege" - 5:39
 "Swoon" - 5:36
 "Tower of Strength" - 8:15
 "Deliverance" - 4:45
 "Like a Child Again" - 3:36
 "Can't Help Falling in Love" - 1:58
 "Like a Hurricane" - 4:52
 "1969" - 3:06
 "Crazy Horses" (Studio Recording) - 2:57

References

The Mission (band) albums
2000 live albums